Rhys Griffiths may refer to:
 Rhys Griffiths (footballer) (born 1980), Welsh football striker
 Rhys Griffiths (rugby league), English rugby league footballer
 Rhys Adrian Griffiths, British playwright and screenwriter